Malam Ibrahim Mahaman Saguirou is a filmmaker from Niger.  His documentaries have won various international prizes.

Career

In 2002 Saguirou found work at Stage IFTIC Contrechamps, Niger. He moved to Africadoc, Dakar in 2004.
In 2005 he was an intern at Moppan in Jos, Nigeria, and the same year worked at Cinédoc in Annecy, France.
He was writer-director for the film producer Kutus from 2005 to January 2007.  
He attended the Berlinale Talent Campus in Berlin in 2006.
Saguirou founded the Dangarama company in March 2007.

Work

Saguirou became known when the first African Forum of Documentary Film in December 2006 screened his Un Africain a Annecy (an African in Annecy), a candid look at a young African discovering Western society during his first trip to France.
His second film, La chèvre qui broute, je mange, tu manges (the Goat grazing, I eat, you eat) deals with the sensitive issue of corruption in Niger.
Pour le Meilleur et pour l'Oignon!  (For the Best and for the Onion! - 2008) is a documentary about marriage and the role of food in the culture of Niger.
It tells of the pressure on a young onion farmer to produce more to gain the money required to marry.
The obstacle-filled path of Ousseini, traditional chief of the butchers' guild of Zinder, is the theme of his 2008 film La Robe du temps (The Robe of time).
In these two films Saguirou was forced to be his own producer due to the lack of funding endemic in the film industry on his country.

Filmography
Saguirou's films include:

References

Nigerien film directors
Living people
Year of birth missing (living people)